Rory James Loy (born 19 March 1988) is a Scottish former professional footballer now working as a football commentator on radio and television. He last played for Scottish League One side Dumbarton. He has previously played for Rangers, Dunfermline Athletic, St Mirren (two spells), Carlisle United and Dundee and Falkirk (two spells). Loy has also represented Scotland at under-21 international level.

Early life
Loy was born in Dumfries on 19 March 1988 and grew up in the town of Stranraer and the village of Sandhead. He attended Sandhead Primary School and Stranraer Academy.

Club career

Rangers

Loy began his career with Kilmarnock in 2004 at age of fourteen before being snapped up by Rangers for £20,000 in 2006. In October 2007, Loy signed a one-year extension to his Rangers contract to remain at Ibrox until the summer of 2009. In March 2009, having impressed on loan, Loy signed a further two-year extension to his Rangers contract, keeping him at the club until the summer of 2011.

He made his first team debut in a Scottish Premier League match against Inverness CT on 1 November 2008, coming on as a substitute in the 56th minute.

Dunfermline Athletic (loan)
In December 2008, he joined Dunfermline Athletic on loan until 26 January 2009. After the move, Loy revealed it was a chance he couldn't turn down. Loy made his debut, several days after joining the club, coming on as a substitute for Andy Kirk, in a 2–1 win over Queen of the South and scored his first goal for the club on 17 January 2009, in a 1–1 draw against Airdrie United. His loan was then extended till the end of the season. Having agreed the loan extension, Loy believed it could help him earn a first team place when he returned to Rangers. Later in the season, Loy scored two more goals in matches against Partick Thistle and Morton.

St Mirren (first loan)
On 29 January 2010, Loy joined Scottish Premier League rival St Mirren on a six-month loan deal. He made his debut as a substitute for Garry Brady, in a 1–0 loss against Hamilton Academical on 2 February 2010. However, Loy wasn't in the starting line-up regularly, due to a virus he suffered along with team-mate Paul Gallacher, John Potter and Lee Mair.

Carlisle United

On 28 January 2011, English League One side Carlisle United announced the signing of Loy on a permanent deal from Rangers on a two and a half-year deal for an undisclosed fee. After the move, Loy stated he had to leave Rangers to help revive his career.

Loy made a slow start for the club, but on 1 March 2011, he scored his first goal and set up a goal for Ben Marshall, who then, in turn, set up a goal for Loy, in a 3–1 win over Charlton. In the Football League Trophy Final, Loy played the final two minutes after coming on as a substitute for Tom Taiwo as Carlisle United beat Brentford. With lack of first team players, Manager Greg Abbott promised that he would give Loy and Paddy Madden first team opportunities next season.

In his first full season, Loy scored three goals before his season was ended, when he suffered a broken leg on Boxing Day in a fixture against Preston after a nasty challenge from David Gray, which led to a nine-minute delay during the match. Loy's injury would lead the club to suffer a strikers crisis. His injury resulted in undergoing surgery; which was successful. His injury also led to Preston wishing Loy a speedy recovery, when the caretaker manager visited him. Two months later, in mid-February, Loy managed to walk without using crutches.

The next season, Loy would spend five months on the sidelines after having another setback due to injury. On 31 December 2012, Loy made his first appearance since his injury, coming on as a substitute for Brad Potts, in a 1–0 loss against Crewe. Upon his return, Manager Greg Abbott said Loy has returned more sharp and positive. At the start of February, Loy scored against Tranmere Rovers, Stevenage and Portsmouth in three consecutive games. After scoring in one of the matches, Loy says was delighted to make his return and that his absence helped him appreciate playing first-team football. At the end of the season, Loy was among seven players to be released, upon the expiry of their contract. Days after his release, Loy attracted interest from a number of teams, according to his agent. While Loy, himself, says on Twitter: "Met some people and made some memories at #cufc that will stick with me forever. Two years gone by in a flash. Loved every minute. Some real nice messages from the #cufc fans. Nice touch and always nice to know you were appreciated. Thank you."

Falkirk (first spell)
In July 2013, Loy started training with Scottish First Division side Falkirk and played as a trialist in a friendly against Forfar, scoring both goals as the Bairns won 2–1. He also played in Falkirk's 2–2 friendly draw with Dunfermline. Loy signed a two-year contract with  Falkirk on 31 July 2013.

Loy quickly established himself in the Falkirk side, scoring a double in his first home appearance against Greenock Morton on 17 August 2013. Loy scored his first hat trick for Falkirk in a 5–0 win against Cowdenbeath on 5 April 2014. He said his aim was for the club to win the Scottish Championship

Throughout the season he became renowned for his hard work and composed finishing, and this helped him build a strong rapport with The Bairns faithful. Loy was nominated along with Peter MacDonald, Anthony Andreu and Kane Hemmings for the PFA Championship Player of the Year for season 2013–14, but lost out to Hemmings. However, on 27 April 2014, he was awarded the Falkirk Supporters Player of the Year, along with the Players Player of the Year, capping an overall superb campaign. He was also handed the Falkirk Herald's Starshot award for the season, previously won by fan favourites Michael McGovern, Mark Millar, Ryan Flynn and Scott Arfield. Loy would add to his awards when he was named in the 2013–14 Scottish Championship team of year. Throughout the season he was also named as Falkirk's player of the month for September, February and March by the club's supporters.

Falkirk manager Gary Holt confirmed on 1 May 2014, that Loy was one of a few players to be offered an improved contract at the club, with his current deal running until 2015, Having yet to sign a new contract, Loy, nevertheless, started the season well when he scored his first goals of the season, in a 7–1 win over East Stirlingshire in the first round of the Challenge Cup. Loy scored his first league goal, in the opening game of the season, in a 2–2 draw against Cowdenbeath on 9 August 2014. A few weeks later on 23 August 2014, Loy scored, in a 1–0 win over Hibernian. He added three more goals by the end of 2014 against Cowdenbeath, Alloa Athletic and Dumbarton. By the end of January, Loy added two more goals when he scored against Queen of the South and Hearts.

On the last day of the winter transfer window, Scottish Premiership side Hamilton Academical made a bid to sign Loy, but the bid was turned down. Loy added his ninth goal of the season on 27 February 2015, in a 1–1 draw against Rangers. However he missed the remainder of the season after suffering a leg injury. Despite this, Loy was named in the 2014–15 Championship Team of the Year. Loy managed to recover from injury in time for the Scottish Cup, by visiting The FA's St George's Park for two weeks. Loy eventually started in the final in his last appearance for the club as Falkirk lost 2–1 to Inverness Caledonian Thistle.

Dundee
On 23 February 2015, Loy signed a pre-contract agreement with Dundee, agreeing to join the club on a three-year deal at the beginning of the 2015–16 season. He scored twice on his competitive debut for Dundee, in a 4–0 win away to Kilmarnock. He left Dundee by mutual consent on 4 July 2017.

St Mirren (second loan)
On 12 January 2017, Loy joined Scottish Championship side St Mirren on loan, having previously been on loan with the club 7 years earlier. Towards the end of the campaign Loy hit a good run of form, scoring important goals including the one that ultimately kept St Mirren in the Championship in the last game of the season against Hibernian at Easter Road.

Falkirk (second spell)
On 4 July 2017, Loy returned to Falkirk on a two-year deal. He left the club in June 2018 by mutual consent having scored just once in 26 appearances.

Dumbarton 
After leaving Falkirk Loy signed a two-year deal with Scottish League One side Dumbarton. He made his debut for the club in a Scottish League Cup against Kilmarnock in July 2018, setting up the club's second goal in a 4–2 defeat. His spell with the Sons was badly restricted by injury however, as he made just 12 appearances before being leaving the club a year into his two-year deal.

International career
Loy made his Scotland U21 debut against Northern Ireland in November 2008. He gained four further caps at this level in 2009 against Albania, Austria, Belarus and Azerbaijan. Loy scored a goal in the 4–0 win against Azerbaijan.

Career statistics

Honours

Club
Carlisle United
Football League Trophy: 2011

References

External links

1988 births
Living people
Scottish footballers
Scotland under-21 international footballers
Rangers F.C. players
Dunfermline Athletic F.C. players
St Mirren F.C. players
Carlisle United F.C. players
Scottish Premier League players
English Football League players
Scottish Football League players
People educated at Stranraer Academy
Association football forwards
Footballers from Dumfries and Galloway
Falkirk F.C. players
Scottish Professional Football League players
Dundee F.C. players
Dumbarton F.C. players
People from Stranraer